{{DISPLAYTITLE:C10H14N2O3}}
The molecular formula C10H14N2O3 (molar mass: 210.23 g/mol, exact mass: 210.1004 u) may refer to:

 Aprobarbital
 Clocental
 Crotylbarbital

Molecular formulas